Hexacyrtis, common name Namib lily, is a plant genus native to Namibia and South Africa but cultivated elsewhere as an ornamental plant. At present (April 2014) only one species is recognized: Hexacyrtis dickiana Dinter. It bears an umbel with nodding flowers, the tepals recurved, red towards the tips but yellow near the center.

References

External links
Africa Seeds, Hexacyrtis dickiana
iSpot, SANBI Diversity of Life, Hexacyrtis dickiana
Age Photostock, Hexacyrtis dickiana from Namibia

Colchicaceae genera
Monotypic Liliales genera
Flora of Namibia
Flora of South Africa
Colchicaceae
Taxa named by Kurt Dinter